The brush cuckoo (Cacomantis variolosus) is a member of the cuckoo family.

The brush cuckoo is native to Malesia, New Guinea, the Solomon Islands and northern and eastern Australia. It is a grey-brown bird with a buff breast. Its call is a familiar sound of the Australian and Indonesian bush.

Taxonomy
Twelve subspecies have been recognised:
 Cacomantis variolosus addendus (Rothschild & Hartert, 1901) – Solomon Islands.
 Cacomantis variolosus aeruginosus (Salvadori, 1878) – Central Maluku Islands (Sula Islands, Buru, Ambon, Seram).
 Cacomantis variolosus blandus (Rothschild & Hartert, 1914) – Admiralty Islands.
 Cacomantis variolosus dumetorum (Gould, 1845) – northern Australia.
 Cacomantis variolosus everetti (Hartert, 1925) – Sulu Archipelago.
 Cacomantis variolosus infaustus (Cabanis & Heine, 1863) – North and south Maluku Islands (Morotai, Tidore, Ternate, Halmahera, Bacan, Obi, Seram Laut, Watubela, Kai), western Papuan Islands (Gebe, Waigeo, Salawati, Kofiau, Misool, Gorong), Biak, northwest and northern New Guinea east to the Sepik River and islands northeast of New Guinea as far as Umboi.
 Cacomantis variolosus macrocercus (Stresemann, 1921) – Bismarck Archipelago except Admiralty Islands and New Hanover.
 Cacomantis variolosus oreophilus (Hartert, 1925) – Eastern and southern highlands of New Guinea.
 Cacomantis variolosus sepulcralis (S. Müller, 1843) – Tanintharyi Region of southern Myanmar, Thailand, Malay Peninsula, Sumatra, Java, Borneo, Lesser Sunda Islands to Philippines.
 Cacomantis variolosus variolosus (Vigors & Horsfield, 1827) – southeastern Australia.
 Cacomantis variolosus virescens (Brüggemann, 1876) – Sulawesi, Buton, Tukangbesi, Banggai, Peleng.
 Cacomantis variolosus websteri (Hartert, 1898) – New Hanover.

Most are geographically isolated, though some come into contact outside of the breeding season. For example, on Seram, members of the nominate subspecies variolosus join the local aeruginosus during the southern hemisphere winter.

The convention of uniting the subspecies under C. variolosus dates back at least to Peters' checklist, but there is uncertainty about whether they all belong there or not. For example, some ornithologists treat sepulcralis as a species in its own right (the Rusty-breasted cuckoo). Likewise, aeruginosus is elevated by some to species level (the Moluccan cuckoo), but is placed by others under C. sepulcralis. Some ornithologists treat infaustus as part of C. variolosus and others as part of C. sepulcralis. The uncertainty arises because differences between the subspecies in characteristics such as plumage colour can be minimal, while  differences in vocalisations are often significant.

Description
The plumage of adult males and females is similar. The head is pale grey, the breast is buff, the back is grey-brown, and the underside of the tail is brown with white tips and bars. The eye has a narrow, pale ring around it, and the feet are olive-pink. Juvenile plumage is heavily barred dark brown. The wings are sharply pointed and backswept in flight. Underwings are grey-brown with pale buff underwing coverts and a white or pale buff bar. The brush cuckoo has a similar appearance to the pallid cuckoo, and especially the fan-tailed and chestnut-breasted cuckoo.

Distribution and habitat
The brush cuckoo is found in northern and eastern Australia, the Solomon Islands, New Guinea, Malaysia, and other islands to the north of Australia. It is resident in parts of its range, such as in Thailand, peninsular Malaysia, Cambodia and southern Vietnam, the Philippines, the Greater Sunda Islands, Lesser Sunda Islands, the Maluku Islands and Timor. It may migrate locally in New Guinea and northern Melanesia. In Australia, it is migratory in the southern part of its range.

In Australia, it is known to inhabit a range of environments including rainforests, rainforest edges, mangrove forests, secondary forests, and plantations.

Ecology
The brush cuckoo is a brood parasite and across its Australian range uses at least 58 other species as hosts, though major hosts are Ramsayornis spp. and the scarlet robin, leaden flycatcher and grey fantail. Its eggs are polymorphic, meaning females lay specific egg types for specific hosts. In Australia, females lay three types of egg depending on their major host in the relevant region of their distribution. Brush cuckoo chicks evict the host eggs or chicks from the nest once they hatch.

Media

References

External links
 ABID Images
 On the HBW Internet Bird Collection

brush cuckoo
brush cuckoo
Birds of Malesia
Birds of New Guinea
Birds of the Solomon Islands
Birds of Australia
brush cuckoo